USS LST-399 was an  in the United States Navy during World War II.

Construction and commissioning 
LST-399 was laid down on 28 September 1942 at Newport News Shipbuilding and Drydock Co., Newport News, Virginia. Launched on 23 November 1942 and commissioned on 4 January 1943.

During World War II, LST-399 was assigned to the Asiatic-Pacific theater and participated in the occupation of New Georgia-Rendova-Vangunu on 21 July and Vella Lavella from 15 and 26 August 1943. Assault on the Treasury Island from 27 October and 6 November 1943.

The capture and occupation of Guam from 21 to 28 July 1944.

The ship participated in the assault and occupation of Iwo Jima from 19 to 25 February 1945 and later the assault and occupation of Okinawa from 1 to 14 April 1945. After the end of the war, the ship was decommissioned on 8 December 1945 and Commander Naval Forces Far East (COMNAVFE) Shipping Control Authority for Japan (SCAJAP), which the ship was re-designated as Q088.

Military Sea Transportation Service acquired the ship on 31 March 1952 and re-designated again as T-LST-399. On 1 November 1973, the T-LST-399 was struck from the Naval Register and was put into the mothball state at the Suisun Bay Reserve Fleet, California. She was later scrapped.

According to Navsource.org, the ship was reinstated and renamed as IX-511, later struck on the Naval Register on 15 June 1985.

LST-399 earned five battle star for World War II service.

Awards 

 Combat Action Ribbon
 Navy Unit Commendation 
 American Campaign Medal 
 Asiatic-Pacific Campaign Medal (5 battle stars)
 World War II Victory Medal 
 Navy Occupation Service Medal (with Asia clasp) 
 National Defense Service Medal

References

LST-1-class tank landing ships
1942 ships
World War II amphibious warfare vessels of the United States
Ships built in Newport News, Virginia